The Chinese Taipei national korfball team is managed by the Chinese Taipei Korfball Association (CTKA), representing Taiwan in korfball international competitions.

Tournament history

Current squad
National team in the 2011 World Championship

References

External links
 Chinese Taipei Korfball Association

National korfball teams
Korfball
National team